Bhajji is the Indian snack food item, akin to Pakora.

Bhajji may also refer to:
Bhajji (princely state), former princely state
Bikaneri Bhujia, or simply Bhujia, a famous Indian snack item
Harbhajan Singh (born 1980), nickname Bhajji, Indian cricketer

See also
Bargee